The First Ten Years: The Videos (re-issued as From There to Eternity) is a VHS and laserdisc music video compilation released by the heavy metal band Iron Maiden in 1990. It features all of the band's promotional videos from 1980-1990. 
The video is an addition to The First Ten Years CD/double 12" single series, also released by Iron Maiden in 1990.

Track listing

Tracks 17–21 were included on the 1992 reissue of The First Ten Years: The Videos, re-titled as From There to Eternity.

Certifications

References

Iron Maiden video albums
1990 video albums
Music video compilation albums
1990 compilation albums

bg:From There to Eternity
fr:From There to Eternity
it:From There to Eternity
no:From There to Eternity
fi:From There to Eternity
sv:From There to Eternity